Averitt may refer to:

Averitt Express, transportation and supply chain management company based in Cookeville, Tennessee, United States
Averitt House (disambiguation) 
Averitt-Herod House, historic house in Hartsville, Tennessee, U.S.
Averitt-Winchester House, historic house in Miccosukee, Florida, U.S.
Bird Averitt (1952–2020), American basketball player
Bush Stadium at Averitt Express Baseball Complex, baseball venue in Cookeville, Tennessee, United States
Dawn Averitt (born 1968), American HIV/AIDS treatment policy advocate and activist
Jack N. Averitt College of Graduate Studies, one of the eight colleges at Georgia Southern University in Statesboro, Georgia
Kip Averitt (born 1954), former Republican member of the Texas Senate

See also
Averett (disambiguation)
Everitt